Lichtenau is a ghost town in Coshocton County, in the U.S. state of Ohio.

History
Lichtenau (German meaning "pasture of light") was founded as an Indian Christian settlement in the late 18th century by German-speaking missionaries of the Moravian Church.

References

Geography of Coshocton County, Ohio
Settlements of the Moravian Church
Ghost towns in Ohio